The 2011 Pacific Games men's rugby sevens tournament was held in New Caledonia from 31 August to 2 September 2011 in Nouméa. Samoa won the gold medal defeating Fiji by 21–19 in the final. Papua New Guinea took the bronze medal defeating Niue 10–5 in the third place match.

Participants

Format
The 12 teams were drawn into 3 groups. The top 2 teams from the first stage alongside the best two third placed teams advanced to the quarterfinal stage. The quarterfinals and semifinals were followed by the matches for the Gold Medal (first place) and Bronze Medal (third place).

Preliminary round

Group A

Group B

Group C

Knockout stage

Championship bracket

Quarterfinals

Semifinals

Third place

Final

Middle bracket

5th–8th semifinals

Seventh place

Fifth place

Lower bracket

9th–12th semifinals

Eleventh place

Ninth place

See also
Rugby sevens at the Pacific Games
Women's Rugby sevens at the 2011 Pacific Games
Pacific Games

Notes

References

Rugby sevens at the 2011 Pacific Games